Terence David Hands   (9 January 1941 – 4 February 2020) was an English theatre director. He founded the Liverpool Everyman Theatre and ran the Royal Shakespeare Company for thirteen years during one of the company's most successful periods; he spent 25 years in all with the RSC. He also saved Clwyd Theatr Cymru from closure and turned it into the most successful theatre in Wales in his seventeen years as Artistic Director. He received several Olivier, Tony and Molière awards and nominations for directing and lighting.

Early years
Hands was born at Aldershot, Hampshire, England. He studied at Woking Grammar School, University of Birmingham before attending the Royal Academy of Dramatic Art leaving with the gold medal for acting in 1964. He then established the Liverpool Everyman where he directed numerous productions, including a prominent production of T.S. Eliot's "Murder in the Cathedral".

Career
Hands joined the Royal Shakespeare Company two years later in 1966 to run the company's touring group, Theatregoround. He became joint Artistic Director with Trevor Nunn in 1978, and in 1986 sole chief executive. As Director Emeritus and Artistic Director he directed more productions during his 25 years there than any other director in the company’s history. These included the entire History Cycle with Alan Howard, Much Ado About Nothing and Edmund Rostand's Cyrano de Bergerac with Derek Jacobi and Sinéad Cusack (both productions transferred to Broadway), Christopher Marlowe's Tamburlaine with Sir Antony Sher, Loves Labours Lost with Ralph Fiennes, Anton Chekov's The Seagull with Sir Simon Russell Beale, A Winter’s Tale with Jeremy Irons, Othello with Sir Ben Kingsley and David Suchet and the award-winning musical Poppy.

In 1997, Hands became Artistic Director of Theatr Clwyd (afterwards renamed Clwyd Theatr Cymru), which presents much of its work on tour in Wales and the rest of the UK, saving the theatre from closure.

He was appointed CBE in the 2007 Queen's New Years Honours List for his services to drama. In October 2001 he resigned from his position as an advisory director of the RSC.

In 2015 Hands left his post as Artistic Director of Clwyd Theatr Cymru after seventeen years in the post, having turned the theatre into the most successful in Wales.

His international directing credits include productions in Berlin, Brussels, Chicago, London, New York, Oslo, Paris, Tokyo, Vienna and Zurich. From 1975 to 1980 he was consultant-director of the Comédie-Française and was a Chevalier of Arts and Letters. His Opera directing credits include "Otello" with Plácido Domingo (Paris Opera) and Parsifal (Royal Opera House).

Personal life
Hands was married to soprano Dame Josephine Barstow (1964–1967), and afterwards to actress Ludmila Mikaël (1974–1980), with whom he had a daughter, actress Marina Hands. He had two sons. In 2002 he married director Emma Lucia.

Awards and nominations
Awards
 1978: Laurence Olivier Award for Best Director – Henry VI
 1983: Critics' Circle Theatre Awards for Best Classical Director – Cyrano de Bergerac
 1983: Laurence Olivier Award for Best Director – Cyrano de Bergerac
 1993: Evening Standard Awards for Best Director – Tamburlaine The Great'
 1993: Critics' Circle Theatre Awards for Best Director – Tamburlaine The GreatNominations
 1985: Tony Award for Best Director of a Play – Much Ado About Nothing
 1985: Tony Award for Best Lighting Design – Much Ado About Nothing
 1985: Tony Award for Best Lighting Design – Cyrano De Bergerac

Stage productions
Theatregoround – Touring RSC
1966: The Second Shepherd's Play1966: The Proposal, Anton Chekhov
1967: The Criminals, José Triana
1967: The Dumb Waiter, Harold Pinter
1967–1968: Under Milk Wood, Dylan Thomas

RSC (Royal Shakespeare Theatre and Aldwych Theatre)

1968: The Merry Wives of Windsor1968: The Latent Heterosexual, Paddy Chayefsky
1969: Bartholomew Fair, Ben Jonson
1969: Pericles, Prince of Tyre1969: Women Beware Women, Thomas Middleton
1970: Richard III1971: The Balcony, Jean Genet
1971: The Man of Mode, George Etherege
1971–72: The Merchant of Venice (Also on UK tour)
1972: Murder in the Cathedral, T. S. Eliot
1973: Romeo and Juliet1973: Cries from Casement as His Bones are Brought to Dublin, David Rudkin
1974: The Actor, (RSC Australian Tour)
1974: The Bewitched, Peter Barnes
1975–76: Henry IV parts 1 and 21975–76: Henry V (Also International tour)
1975–76: The Merry Wives of Windor1977:  Old World, Aleksei Arbuzov
1977–78: Henry VI Parts 1,2 and 31978: The Changeling, Thomas Middleton and William Rowley
1978–79: Coriolanus (also international tour)
1979: Children of the Sun, Maxim Gorky
1979–80: Twelfth Night1980–81: As You Like It1980–81: Richard II1980–81: Richard III1981: Troilus and Cressida1982–83: Arden of Faversham1982–84: Much Ado About NothingRSC at the Barbican Theatres and Royal Shakespeare Theatre

1982: Poppy, Peter Nichols
1983–984: Cyrano de Bergerac, Edmond Rostand (Also International tour)
1985: Red Noses, Peter Barnes
1985–86: The Winter's Tale1987: The Balcony, Jean Genet
1987–88: Julius Caesar1988: Carrie (musical), Stephen King
1988: Scenes from a Marriage, Peter Barnes

1989: Romeo and Juliet1989–90: Coriolanus, co-directed with John Barton
1989–90: Singer, Peter Flannery (At The Swan, and The Pit)
1990–91: Love's Labour's Lost1990–91: The Seagull, Anton Chekhov
1993: Tamburlaine the Great, Christopher Marlowe
1995: The Merry Wives of Windsor (at The National Theatre)

Chichester Festival
1995: Hadrian VII, Chichester Festival Theatre
1995: The Visit, Chichester Festival Theatre

Clwyd Theatr Cymru

 1997: Equus 1998: A Christmas Carol, Peter Barnes
 1998: The Journey of Mary Kelly, Siân Evans
 1998: Table Manners 1998: Living Together 1998: Round And Round The Garden 1999: Twelfth Night 1999: Macbeth 2000: Under Milk Wood, Dylan Thomas
 2001: King Lear 2001: Bedroom Farce 2001: The Rabbit, Meredydd Barker
 2002: Rosencrantz and Guildenstern Are Dead, Tom Stoppard
 2002: Romeo and Juliet 2002: The Four Seasons, Arnold Wesker
 2002: Betrayal 2003: Blithe Spirit, Noël Coward
 2003: The Crucible, Arthur Miller
 2004: One Flew Over the Cuckoo's Nest, Ken Kesey
 2005: Brassed Off 2005: Troilus and Cressida 2005: Brassed Off (Revival) 2005: Night Must Fall 2006: A Chorus of Disapproval 2006: Memory 2007: Arcadia 2007: Memory (Revival in New York) 2007: The Cherry Orchard 2008: Macbeth 2008: Memory (Revival in London and Wales tour) 2009: Noises Off 2009: Mary Stuart (featuring his daughter, Marina Hands as Mary)
 2009: Pygmalion 2010: Arden of Faversham 2010: A Small Family Business 2010: Blackthorn 2011: The Taming of the Shrew 2012: As You Like It 2012: Boeing Boeing 2013: The Winslow Boy 2014: Under Milk Wood 2015: HamletReferences

Further reading
 Trowbridge, Simon: The Company: A Biographical Dictionary of the Royal Shakespeare Company'', Oxford: Editions Albert Creed (2010);

External links
 
 
 Hands' profile, filmreference.com; accessed 4 February 2020.

 

1941 births
2020 deaths
Drama Desk Award winners
English theatre directors
Laurence Olivier Award winners
Academics of the University of Glamorgan
Commanders of the Order of the British Empire
Businesspeople from Aldershot
Alumni of the University of Birmingham
Alumni of RADA